Girls Nation is an annual civic training program run by the American Legion Auxiliary.  It is analogous to Boys Nation.

The first American Legion Auxiliary Girls Nation was held August 9-August 14, 1947, with 82 girls and 41 states participating. It has been held each year subsequently. In order to attend the event, participating Girls State sessions select two participants to represent the state at Girls Nation. It, much like Girls State, is a "hands on" election simulation, only focusing on federal government rather than state government. These representatives, the Girls Nation "senators," are divided into two political parties. The parties do not reflect the two major political parties in today's system, but allow citizens to gain a special knowledge of how the system works. Girls Nation is funded by the national organization of the Auxiliary, with some support from each participating state. Little or no expense is required of the representative or her family.

The Auxiliary has been recognized many times by Freedoms Foundation at Valley Forge, Pennsylvania and the National Association of Secondary School Principals (NASSP) for outstanding Girls State and Girls Nation programs. It has also been recognized through the media in "Career World" magazine, WAM!, Children's Television Network (Encore Media Corporation), and many newspapers. The delegates of Girls Nation, alongside the American Legion's Boys Nation delegates, are additionally given the opportunity to meet the president as well as other House Representatives and Senators during their week long program.

At this point in time, 100 girls attend Girls Nation. Hawaii began participation in Girls Nation in 2016.

Program Goals
The official goals of the program are to
 Develop leadership and pride in American citizens;
 Educate participants about the American system of government;
 Instill in participants a greater understanding of American traditions;
 Stimulate a desire to maintain American government processes.

References

American Legion
Educational organizations based in the United States
Youth organizations established in 1947
1947 establishments in the United States